Phulray Syedan is a village and union council of Jhelum District in the Punjab province of Pakistan. It is part of Sohawa Tehsil.

Beautiful village 42 km away from Chakwal, 62 km from District Jhelum, 87 km from Rawalpindi and 95 km from our Capital Islamabad.

Though town is far from cities but having all necessary facilities available to meet daily needs.

10 grocery shops, 3-4 Veggies shops and 1 Chicken Shop available in town. 3-4 Gents and 3-4 Ladies tailors are in town. 2 barbers and 1 cobbler.

Village is full of beautiful scenes and with a little touch of village lifestyle, cows, buffalo's and goats.

Peoples are very friendly and loving. In the afternoon youth in the village enjoys playing Cricket, Football, Volleyball, Badminton, Ludo. Elders in the willage spend their free time playing cards.

There are 2 High Schools for girls and boys. And Union Council and Govt. Hospital facility.

References

Populated places in Tehsil Sohawa
Union councils of Sohawa Tehsil